Hydriomena clarkei is a species of moth in the family Geometridae. This species is endemic to New Zealand. It is classified as "At Risk, Declining'" by the Department of Conservation.

Taxonomy
This species was first described by George Howes in 1917 and named Chloroclystis clarkei. Howes used a specimen collected by Charles E. Clarke in March at Flagstaff Hill in Dunedin and named the species in his honour. George Hudson discussed and illustrated this species in his 1928 book The Butterflies and Moths of New Zealand. In 1988 John S. Dugdale placed this species within the genus Hydriomena. The holotype specimen is held at the Auckland War Memorial Museum. The genus level classification of this moth is currently regarded as unsatisfactory. As such the species is also known as Hydriomena (s.l.) clarkei.

Description
Howes described the female adult of the species as follows:

Distribution
This species is endemic to New Zealand. It has occurred in Dunedin, Central Otago and at the Otago Lakes. H. clarkei is considered extinct at its type locality of Flagstaff Hill.

Biology and life cycle
Much of the biology of H. clarkei is unknown. This species is on the wing in February and March.

Host plants and habitat
The host plants of the larvae of this species are unknown but it has been reared in captivity on Geranium species. Hudson states that the species could be located amongst shrub-land containing Dracophyllum and Leucopogon species.

Conservation status
This moth is classified under the New Zealand Threat Classification system as being "At Risk, Declining".

References

Sterrhinae
Moths described in 1917
Moths of New Zealand
Endemic fauna of New Zealand
Endangered biota of New Zealand
Taxa named by George Howes (entomologist)
Endemic moths of New Zealand